Build One South Africa (BOSA) is a South African political party. It is led by Mmusi Maimane, the leader of the One SA Movement and the former leader of the Democratic Alliance. While the deputy leader is Nobuntu Hlazo-Webster, founder and convener of the South African Women’s Commission. The chairperson of the party is the current Nelson Mandela Bay deputy mayor Mkhuseli Jack. The party was launched on 24 September 2022 in Naledi, Soweto.

The party will contest the 2024 general elections as an "umbrella organisation" for independent candidates. Maimane will stand as the party's presidential candidate in the elections.

References

2022 establishments in South Africa
Political parties established in 2022
Political parties in South Africa